Dubai Parks and Resorts is the Middle East's largest integrated leisure and theme park destination located on Sheikh Zayed road in Dubai, United Arab Emirates. Spread over 25 million square feet, it features more than 100 rides and attractions, and consists of three theme parks: Motiongate Dubai, Bollywood Parks Dubai and Legoland Dubai, and one water park: Legoland Water Park. It also encompasses Riverland Dubai, a themed retail and dining destination, as well as the Polynesian-themed family resort, Lapita Hotel Dubai.

The official opening took place on 18 December 2016.

Development history 
The Dubai Parks and Resorts project was announced in 2012 and construction started in 2014.

In 2014, the company signed agreements with DreamWorks Animation, Columbia Pictures, Merlin Entertainments and various Bollywood studios to bring beloved Hollywood and Bollywood characters to its theme parks.

In 2015, Dubai Parks and Resorts signed an agreement with Lionsgate, for a fifth themed zone in Motiongate Dubai. In 2016, the company announced the commencement of construction for Six Flags Dubai, the fourth theme park to be added to the Dubai Parks and Resorts destination.

In 2016 Dubai Parks and Resorts released its official theme song, All the Wonders of the Universe, created by Academy Award winner Alan Menken.

On 31 October 2016, Dubai Parks and Resorts opened the doors to Legoland Dubai and Riverland Dubai. This followed by the opening of Bollywood Parks Dubai on 17 November 2016 and Motiongate Dubai on 16 December 2016. The official inauguration was held on 18 December 2016, an event that was broadcast live across the globe.

In 2017, the remaining elements of Dubai Parks and Resorts launched when both the Legoland Water Park and the Lapita Hotel opened to paying guests on 2 January. Later in the year, DXB Entertainments announced a 60:40 partnership with Merlin Entertainments to bring a 250-room Lego themed hotel to the Dubai Parks and Resorts destination.

Timeline 
2012:
 Dubai Parks and Resorts project announced by His Highness Sheikh Mohammed bin Rashid Al Maktoum, Vice-President and Prime Minister of the United Arab Emirates (UAE), and Ruler of Dubai.

2014:
 Groundbreaking starts on the Dubai Parks and Resorts project in Jebel Ali, Dubai
 Agreements signed with leading entertainment properties DreamWorks, Columbia Pictures, Merlin Entertainments (Legoland) and various Bollywood studios

2015:
 Agreement signed with Lionsgate for the fifth zone at Motiongate Dubai

2016:
 Company announces the addition of Six Flags Dubai to the Dubai Parks and Resorts destination, due to open in late 2019
 Legoland Dubai opens to the public on 31 October 2016
 Bollywood Parks Dubai opens to the public on 17 November 2016
 Motiongate Dubai opens to the public on 16 December 2016
2017:
 Legoland Water Park opens to the public on 10 January 2017
 Lapita Hotel opens to the public on 2 January 2017
 The Company announces a joint partnership with Merlin Entertainments to bring a Lego themed hotel to the Dubai Parks and Resorts destination

2019:
 Dubai Parks and Resorts announced that Six Flags Dubai was cancelled.
2022:

 Dubai Parks and Resorts announced their partnership with Real Madrid CF, with opening the world's first football theme park in Q4 2023.

Images

See also
 Dubailand

References

External links 

Amusement parks opened in 2016
Resorts in Dubai